Jack Dylan Grazer (born September 3, 2003) is an American actor. He is known for his roles as Eddie Kaspbrak in the 2017 film It and as Freddy Freeman in the superhero  film Shazam! (2019). The Hollywood Reporter named him one of the top 30 stars under age 18 in 2018.

Life and career
Grazer was born in Los Angeles, California, the son of Angela Lafever and Gavin Grazer, an actor. His uncle is producer Brian Grazer. Grazer sponsors a scholarship at the Adderley School for Performing Arts in Pacific Palisades, where he is an alumnus, for two students annually.

He began his acting career by playing guest roles in film and on television. Grazer had his Breakthrough role in an adaptation of Stephen King's novel It, playing the role of Eddie Kaspbrak in the supernatural horror films It (2017) and It Chapter Two (2019). He also starred on the CBS series Me, Myself, and I. Grazer portrayed Freddy Freeman in the 2019 DC Extended Universe film Shazam! and will reprise his role in the 2023 sequel Shazam! Fury of the Gods. Grazer had lead roles in Luca Guadagnino's coming-of-age drama television series We Are Who We Are (2020) and in the thriller film Don't Tell a Soul (2020). He voiced Alberto in the Pixar film Luca (2021), and voiced Barney in the animated film Ron's Gone Wrong (2021). He also appeared in the 2022 DC Comics animated film Batman and Superman: Battle of the Super Sons as the son of Superman, Jonathan Kent.

Personal life 
In July 2021, Grazer came out as bisexual during an Instagram livestream and declared "he/they" as his pronouns.

Film

Television

Accolades

Notes

References

External links

 
 

Living people
American male film actors
American male television actors
American male child actors
21st-century American male actors
2003 births
Bisexual male actors
American male voice actors
LGBT people from California
Male actors from Los Angeles
American bisexual actors